Count The Cost was David Meece's sixth album.

Track listing 

All songs written by David Meece, except where noted.

"Gloria" - 3:59
"Making My Life Brand New" - 4:19
"Falling Down" - 3:04
"Pressing On" - 3:46
"Some People They Never Believe" - 3:22
"Count The Cost" (John Thompson, Randy Scruggs) - 2:51
"I Don't Know What I'd Do Without You" - 5:10
"Today Is The Day" - 2:29
"And You Know It's Right" (Meece, Brown Bannister, Michael W. Smith) - 4:25
"Replace It With Your Love" - 4:00

Personnel 
 David Meece – lead vocals 
 Shane Keister – keyboards, synthesizers
 Michael W. Smith – keyboards, synthesizers 
 Jon Goin – guitars 
 Mike Brignardello – bass
 Paul Leim – drums 
 Clyde Brooks – snare drum (9)
 Farrell Morris – percussion 
 John Rommel – flugelhorn, piccolo
 Bobby Taylor – English horn
 Alan Moore – arrangements 
 Jackie Cusic – backing vocals 
 Diana DeWitt – backing vocals 
 Kim Fleming – backing vocals 
 Donna McElroy – backing vocals 
 Gary Pigg – backing vocals

Production 
 Producer – Brown Bannister
 Executive Producers – Michael Blanton and Dan Harrell
 Engineer – Jack Joseph Puig 
 Assistant Engineer – Don Cobb
 Recorded at Caribou Ranch (Nederland, CO); Bullet Recording and SoundStage Studios (Nashville, TN).
 Remixed at The Bennett House (Franklin, TN).
 Mastered by Doug Sax at The Mastering Lab (Los Angeles, CA).
 Photography – Michael Borum

Charts

References

David Meece albums
1983 albums